The 2000 United States presidential election in South Dakota took place on November 7, 2000, and was part of the 2000 United States presidential election. Voters chose three representatives, or electors to the Electoral College, who voted for president and vice president.

South Dakota was won by Governor George W. Bush by a 22.74 point margin of victory.

Results

Results by county

Counties that flipped from Democratic to Republican
Beadle (Largest city: Huron)
Bon Homme (Largest city: Springfield)
Brown (Largest city: Aberdeen)
Brule (Largest city: Chamberlain)
Charles Mix (Largest city: Wagner)
Corson (Largest city: McLaughlin)
Day (Largest city: Webster)
Deuel (Largest city: Clear Lake)
Grant (Largest city: Milbank)
Jerauld (Largest city: Wessington Springs)
Kingsbury (Largest city: De Smet)
Lake (Largest city: Madison)
Marshall (Largest city: Britton)
Miner (Largest city: Howard)
Minnehaha (Largest city: Sioux Falls)
Moody (Largest city: Flandreau)
Roberts (Largest city: Sisseton)
Sanborn (Largest city: Woonsocket)
Union (Largest city: Dakota Dunes)
Ziebach (Largest city: Dupree)

By congressional district
Due to the state's low population, only one congressional district is allocated. This district is called the At-Large district, because it covers the entire state, and thus is equivalent to the statewide election results.

Electors

The electors of each state and the District of Columbia met on December 18, 2000 to cast their votes for president and vice president. The Electoral College itself never meets as one body. Instead the electors from each state and the District of Columbia met in their respective capitols.

The following were the members of the Electoral College from the state. All were pledged to and voted for George Bush and Dick Cheney:
Carole Hillard
William J. Janklow
Joel Rosenthal

See also
 Presidency of George W. Bush
 United States presidential elections in South Dakota

References

South Dakota
2000
Presidential